The 22nd parallel north is a circle of latitude that is 22 degrees north of the Earth's equatorial plane. It crosses Africa, Asia, the Indian Ocean, the Pacific Ocean, North America, the Caribbean and the Atlantic Ocean.

The majority of the border between Egypt and Sudan follows the parallel.

At this latitude the sun is visible for 13 hours, 29 minutes during the summer solstice and 10 hours, 47 minutes during the winter solstice.

Around the world
Starting at the Prime Meridian and heading eastwards, the parallel 22° north passes through:

{| class="wikitable plainrowheaders"
! scope="col" width="125" | Co-ordinates
! scope="col" width="215" | Country, territory or sea
! scope="col" | Notes
|-
| 
! scope="row" | 
|
|-
| 
! scope="row" | 
|
|-
| 
! scope="row" | 
|
|-
| 
! scope="row" | 
| 
|-valign="top"
| 
! scope="row" |  /  border
|
|-valign="top"
| 
! scope="row" | 
| The border diverts north at Lake Nasser, enclosing the Wadi Halfa Salient - as it passes through the lake, the parallel is entirely within Sudan
|-
| 
! scope="row" |  /  border
|
|-valign="top"
| 
! scope="row" |  / Bir Tawil border
| Bir Tawil is not claimed by any country.
|-valign="top"
| 
! scope="row" | Hala'ib Triangle /  border
| The Hala'ib Triangle is a disputed territory claimed by both Egypt and Sudan - Egypt controls the territory.
|-
| style="background:#b0e0e6;" | 
! scope="row" style="background:#b0e0e6;" | Red Sea
| style="background:#b0e0e6;" |
|-
| 
! scope="row" | 
|
|-
| 
! scope="row" | 
|
|-
| style="background:#b0e0e6;" | 
! scope="row" style="background:#b0e0e6;" | Indian Ocean
| style="background:#b0e0e6;" | Arabian Sea
|-
| 
! scope="row" | 
| Gujarat - Kathiawar Peninsula
|-
| style="background:#b0e0e6;" | 
! scope="row" style="background:#b0e0e6;" | Indian Ocean
| style="background:#b0e0e6;" | Gulf of Khambhat
|-valign="top"
| 
! scope="row" | 
| Gujarat Madhya Pradesh Chhattisgarh Orissa West Bengal
|-
| 
! scope="row" | 
| Several islands in the Ganges Delta
|-
| style="background:#b0e0e6;" | 
! scope="row" style="background:#b0e0e6;" | Indian Ocean
| style="background:#b0e0e6;" | Bay of Bengal
|-
| 
! scope="row" | 
|
|-
| 
! scope="row" | 
| For about 3 km
|-
| 
! scope="row" |  (Burma)
|
|-
| 
! scope="row" | 
| For about 4 km
|-
| 
! scope="row" |  (Burma)
| For about 5 km
|-
| 
! scope="row" | 
| For about 3 km
|-
| 
! scope="row" |  (Burma)
|
|-
|
! scope="row" | 
| Yunnan - passing just north of Jinghong, Xishuangbanna Dai Autonomous Prefecture
|-
| 
! scope="row" | 
|
|-
| 
! scope="row" | 
|
|-valign="top"
| 
! scope="row" | 
| Guangxi (for about 4 km)
|-
| 
! scope="row" | 
| For about 6 km
|-valign="top"
| 
! scope="row" | 
| Guangxi and Guangdong
|-
| style="background:#b0e0e6;" | 
! scope="row" style="background:#b0e0e6;" | South China Sea
| style="background:#b0e0e6;" |
|-valign="top"
| 
! scope="row" | 
| Passing through islands in the Wanshan Archipelago (Guangdong), about 12 km south of Macau
|-
| style="background:#b0e0e6;" | 
! scope="row" style="background:#b0e0e6;" | South China Sea
| style="background:#b0e0e6;" |
|-valign="top"
| 
! scope="row" | 
| More islands in the Wanshan Archipelago (Guangdong), about 20 km south of Hong Kong
|-
| style="background:#b0e0e6;" | 
! scope="row" style="background:#b0e0e6;" | South China Sea
| style="background:#b0e0e6;" |
|-
| 
! scope="row" | (Taiwan)
| Passing through Hengchun and Kenting 
|-valign="top"
| style="background:#b0e0e6;" | 
! scope="row" style="background:#b0e0e6;" | Pacific Ocean
| style="background:#b0e0e6;" | Passing just south of Orchid Island,  
|-
| 
! scope="row" | 
| Island of Niihau, Hawaii 
|-
| style="background:#b0e0e6;" | 
! scope="row" style="background:#b0e0e6;" | Pacific Ocean
| style="background:#b0e0e6;" |
|-
| 
! scope="row" | 
| Island of Kauai, Hawaii - passing just north of Lihue
|-
| style="background:#b0e0e6;" | 
! scope="row" style="background:#b0e0e6;" | Pacific Ocean
| style="background:#b0e0e6;" | Passing just north of the island of San Juanito, 
|-
| 
! scope="row" | 
| Passing 8 km north of Aguascalientes
|-
| style="background:#b0e0e6;" | 
! scope="row" style="background:#b0e0e6;" | Gulf of Mexico
| style="background:#b0e0e6;" |
|-
| 
! scope="row" | 
|
|-valign="top"
| style="background:#b0e0e6;" | 
! scope="row" style="background:#b0e0e6;" | Caribbean Sea
| style="background:#b0e0e6;" | Gulf of Batabanó - passing just north of Isla de la Juventud,  Gulf of Cazones - passing just south of the Zapata Peninsula, 
|-
| 
! scope="row" | 
| Passing 3 km north of Sancti Spíritus
|-valign="top"
| style="background:#b0e0e6;" | 
! scope="row" style="background:#b0e0e6;" | Atlantic Ocean
| style="background:#b0e0e6;" | Passing between islands of the  Passing just north of North Caicos, 
|-
| 
! scope="row" | Western Sahara
| Claimed by 
|-
| 
! scope="row" | 
|
|-
| 
! scope="row" | 
|
|-
| 
! scope="row" | 
|
|}

See also
21st parallel north
23rd parallel north

References

n22
Egypt–Sudan border